Jan Mertzig (born July 18, 1970) is a Swedish former professional ice hockey player who played 23 games in the National Hockey League.  He played for the New York Rangers. He was awarded Swedish Elite League Rookie of the Year Award for his achievements during the 1995–1996 season.

Career statistics

Regular season and playoffs

International

References

External links 

1970 births
Huddinge IK players
Living people
New York Rangers draft picks
New York Rangers players
Swedish ice hockey defencemen